Ralph Ernest Comstock (July 19, 1912 – July 6, 1999) was an American statistician and geneticist known for his work in quantitative genetics.

Early life and education
Comstock was born on July 19, 1912 in Spring Valley, Minnesota. He received his bachelor's, master's, and Ph.D. degrees from the University of Minnesota in 1934, 1936, and 1938, respectively.

Academic career
Comstock joined the faculty of the University of Minnesota in 1937, where he worked as an assistant professor of animal husbandry from then until 1943. On August 15, 1943, he joined the Department of Experimental Statistics at North Carolina State College, where he initially held a simultaneous position in the Department of Animal Science. He continued to serve as an associate professor at North Carolina State College until 1946, when he took a year off to serve as head of the animal husbandry department at Puerto Rico Agricultural Experiment Station. He then returned to the North Carolina State College faculty, where he continued to teach until joining the University of Minnesota in 1957. In 1965, he was named the first head of the University of Minnesota's Department of Genetics; he continued to hold this position until 1968, whereupon he was named a Regents Professor. He was awarded the Animal Genetics and Breeding Award from the American Society of Animal Science in 1966, and retired from the University of Minnesota in 1981. Also in 1981, he was elected a fellow of the American Association for the Advancement of Science.

Personal life and death
Comstock died on July 6, 1999 in Sun City, Arizona. He was survived by his wife, Helen, as well as by their two children and two grandchildren.

References

External links

1912 births
1999 deaths
American geneticists
American statisticians
People from Spring Valley, Minnesota
University of Minnesota alumni
North Carolina State University faculty
University of Minnesota faculty
Statistical geneticists
Fellows of the American Association for the Advancement of Science